"Long Shot" is a song by American singer Kelly Clarkson, from her fourth studio album, All I Ever Wanted (2009). The song was written by Katy Perry, Glen Ballard, and Matt Thiessen, it was originally recorded by Perry (along with the single "I Do Not Hook Up") for an unreleased album and was later re-recorded by Clarkson. It is a pop song about taking a chance on pursuing a flawed relationship in spite of it being a "long shot."

The song received mixed to positive reviews from critics, who found it to be a "fun" pop song but also generic and unmemorable. In early 2010, the song was played on Canadian radio and entered that country's hot adult contemporary airplay chart despite no official single release or promotion from Clarkson's label.

Background and recording
The song was written by Katy Perry, Glen Ballard, and Matt Thiessen as a track for an unreleased album by Perry conceived sometime between the recording of Katy Hudson (2001) and One of the Boys (2008). When Perry was dropped from the Def Jam label and the project was scrapped, "Long Shot" and "I Do Not Hook Up" were given to RCA Records for Clarkson to record for her then-upcoming album, All I Ever Wanted. Clarkson's rendition was recorded by Mike Plotnikoff in 2008 at Bay7 Studios, Sparky Dark Studio, and Sunset Sound Studios, all located in Los Angeles County, California.

Composition

"Long Shot" is a pop song with a duration of three minutes and thirty-six seconds (3:36). According to the digital sheet music published by MusicNotes.com through Alfred Publishing Co., Inc., it is composed in the key of D minor and is set to a moderately fast tempo of 114 BPM. Clarkson's vocal range spans from C4—C5. The song's instrumentation consists of keyboard, drums, guitar, and bass, which were performed by Howard Benson, Josh Freese, Paul Bushnell, and Phil X, respectively.

The song's lyrics explore the inherent risk of starting or continuing a romantic relationship. Some critics have suggested the song implies a flawed relationship, which Clarkson is fighting to keep together. Elements in the lyrics such as the lines "The chance is we won't make it / But I know if I don't take it there's no chance" deliver a message of perseverance and taking risks to reach your goals.

Critical reception
Stephen Thomas Erlewine of AllMusic praised the cover for "illustrating why [Clarkson]'s a better pop star" than co-writer Katy Perry, writing that the former sounds "impassioned and invested" in her performance, but "better still... relatable." Ann Powers of The Los Angeles Times also noted that Clarkson "removes the cartoon mannerisms" characteristic of Perry's songs in her version of "Long Shot". On the other hand, Claire Lobenfeld of Vibe was critical of Clarkson for what he deemed to be her mimicking Perry's "silly and saucy" style. Daniel Brockman of The Boston Phoenix and Evan Sawdey of PopMatters both cited "Long Shot" as a highlight of the album, with the latter describing the song as a "sturdy, memorable pop number" that succeeds at playing it safe in a "fun" way.

Commercial performance
In February 2010, two Hot AC stations in Canada began playing "Long Shot" as a potential radio single, leading it to enter the New and Active category for the week ending March 6, 2010 with 82 plays. The album's fourth official single, "All I Ever Wanted", impacted Hot AC radio on March 6, 2010. "Long Shot" reached a peak airplay position of 33, in May 2010, before "All I Ever Wanted" entered the chart.

Credits and personnel
Credits adapted from the All I Ever Wanted liner notes.

Personnel
 
 Lead vocals – Kelly Clarkson
 Production, keyboards, programming – Howard Benson
 Assistance (with production) – Graham Hope
 Drums – Josh Freese
 Bass – Paul Bushnell
 Guitar – Phil X

 Production manager – Sam Watters
 Recording – Mike Plotnikoff
 Digital editing – Paul Decarli
 Mixing – Serban Ghenea
 Assistance (with mixing) – Tim Roberts
 Songwriting – Katy Perry, Glen Ballard, Matt Thiessen

Chart performance

References

2009 songs
Katy Perry songs
Kelly Clarkson songs
Songs written by Katy Perry
Songs written by Glen Ballard
Songs written by Matt Thiessen
Song recordings produced by Howard Benson